The Criminal Justice Act 1988 (c 33) is an Act of the Parliament of the United Kingdom.

Title
The title of this Act is:

Unduly lenient sentences 

In England and Wales, the Act granted the Attorney General the power to refer sentences for certain offences to the Court of Appeal if the Attorney General feels that the sentence was unduly lenient, which is sometimes called the 'unduly lenient sentence scheme'. This provision entered into force in 1989, with its first application being in July of that year.

The controversially-low sentences given to the rapists of Jill Saward was one impetus for the scheme, which was justified as ensuring that public trust in justice was maintained by correcting gross errors; in a 2022 answer to a question in parliament, the Government said that the scheme ensures that punishment is aligned with the severity of the crime and assures victims that "justice will be served". The Law Commission is reviewing the law around criminal appeals and the unduly lenient sentences scheme is within this review's terms of reference, beginning in July 2022 and with a green paper expected in 2023. The scheme has been criticised on the grounds of having become "too politicised", and that "too many cases [are being] referred, in some instances on most unusual grounds."

The included offences are those which are indictable and some either-way offences, which are specified by a secretary of state; the list of applicable either-way offences has been expanded since 1994.

Any member of the public may ask the Attorney General to refer a sentence to the Court of Appeal; the Attorney General has four weeks, beginning on the day following the sentence being passed, to consider the sentence's leniency and then to make the referral. Should a referral be made, the Court of Appeal will then consider whether the sentence is not merely lenient but unduly lenient and beyond the reasonable range available to a judge considering all the relevant information available at the time; if that determination is made, then the Court of Appeal will increase the sentence.

The number of requests made to the Attorney General has increased since 2001, from less than 300 in that year to 1,006 in 2018, which, as of 2021's statistics, is the highest number of requests made. However, the number of cases referred to the Court of Appeal has remained within a roughly similar range during that period. Of those cases, the fraction of sentences were found to be unduly lenient has also remained in a rough band between 60% and 90%.

Section 141 - Prohibition of offensive weapons 
This section creates an offence of manufacturing, selling, lending, giving, importing, hiring or exposing for hire offensive weapons, but does not itself define which weapons it applies to. Subsection 141(2) allows a statutory instrument to define them; the only order currently is the Schedule 1 of the Criminal Justice Act 1998 (Offensive Weapons) Order 1988.

Specifically exempted from this section are crossbows and items subject to the Firearms Act 1968

Various amendments have been made to the Schedule to add new weapons, most recently (August 2016) an amendment to this order came into force to include zombie knives in the list of prohibited weapons.

Section 171 - Commencement
The power conferred by section 171(1) has been exercised by the following orders:
The Criminal Justice Act 1988 (Commencement No. 1) Order 1988 (SI 1988/1408) (C 53)
The Criminal Justice Act 1988 (Commencement No. 2) Order 1988 (SI 1988/1676) (C 60)
The Criminal Justice Act 1988 (Commencement No. 3) Order 1988 (SI 1988/1817) (C 65)
The Criminal Justice Act 1988 (Commencement No. 4) Order 1988 (SI 1988/2073) (C 78)
The Criminal Justice Act 1988 (Commencement No. 5) Order 1989 (SI 1989/1) (C 1)
The Criminal Justice Act 1988 (Commencement No. 6) Order 1989 (SI 1989/50) (C 2)
The Criminal Justice Act 1988 (Commencement No. 7) Order 1989 (SI 1989/264) (C 8)
The Criminal Justice Act 1988 (Commencement No. 8) Order 1989 (SI 1989/1085) (C 29)
The Criminal Justice Act 1988 (Commencement No. 9) Order 1989 (SI 1989/1595) (C 55)
The Criminal Justice Act 1988 (Commencement No. 10) Order 1990 (SI 1990/220) (C 10)
The Criminal Justice Act 1988 (Commencement No. 11) Order 1990 (SI 1990/1145) (C 32)
The Criminal Justice Act 1988 (Commencement No. 12) Order 1990 (SI 1990/2084) (C 51)
The Criminal Justice Act 1988 (Commencement No. 13) Order 1999 (SI 1999/3425) (C 93)
The Criminal Justice Act 1988 (Commencement No. 14) Order 2004 (SI 2004/2167) (C 90)

See also
Criminal Justice Act

References
Halsbury's Statutes,

Bibliography

External links
The Criminal Justice Act 1988, as amended from the National Archives.
The Criminal Justice Act 1988, as originally enacted from the National Archives.

United Kingdom Acts of Parliament 1988